Gerlacus Moes (10 August 1902 – 23 April 1965) was a Dutch swimmer. He competed in the men's 200 metre breaststroke event at the 1924 Summer Olympics.

References

External links
 

1902 births
1965 deaths
Olympic swimmers of the Netherlands
Swimmers at the 1924 Summer Olympics
People from Bussum
Dutch male breaststroke swimmers
Sportspeople from North Holland
20th-century Dutch people